Clube de Futebol Benfica Feminino is a Portuguese women's football team from Lisbon. It is the women's section of CF Benfica.

History
Futebol Benfica already played in the top Portuguese level in the 1990s. In the 2010–11 season it returned to the category. Though that same season it reached the Cup final, initially it struggled to avoid relegation. But in the 2013–14 season Futebol Benfica rose to the top positions. The next year, 2014–15, Futebol Benfica won both the championship and the cup. Futebol Benfica repeated the feat in 2015–16, winning both the championship and cup again.

In the 2015–16 season Futebol Benfica made its Champions League debut. Despite winning two out of its three games, Futebol Benfica was eliminated in the qualifying round.

Honours
 Campeonato Nacional
 Winners (2): 2014–15, 2015–16
 Taça de Portugal
 Winners (2): 2014–15, 2015–16
 Supertaça de Portugal
 Winners (1): 2015
 Campeonato Nacional II Divisão
 Winners (1): 2009–10

Current squad

Former players

References

Women's football clubs in Portugal
Turbine Potsdam
Campeonato Nacional de Futebol Feminino teams